Bisby is a surname. Notable people with the surname include:

 Frank Bisby (1945–2011), botanist and pioneer of taxonomy databases
 Guy Richard Bisby (1889-1958), American-Canadian mycologist and plant pathologist
 John Bisby (1876–1945), English footballer
 Louisa Bisby (born 1979), Australian footballer
 Roger Bisby (born 1952), English television presenter and journalist